Sheltersuit is a water- and windproof  jacket which can be transformed into a body suit by zipping it on the sleeping bag. It is an outdoor product made with durable and insulating materials that assures all users warmth and rain protection. After use, the sleeping bag can be stored in the duffle bag. Bas Timmer created the Sheltersuit concept with  the intention to help homeless people survive temperatures below zero degrees. Production costs are €150 (US$164).

In order to offer them for free, Bas Timmer and Alexander de Groot established the Sheltersuit Foundation.

References

Protective gear
Charities based in the Netherlands
Homelessness organizations